The Pannonian dialect group (panonska narečna skupina), or northeastern dialect group, is a group of closely related dialects of Slovene. The Pannonian dialects are spoken in northeastern Slovenia (Prekmurje, in the eastern areas of Slovenian Styria), and among the Hungarian Slovenes.

Phonological and morphological characteristics
Among other features, this group is characterized by loss of pitch accent, non-lengthened short syllables, and a new acute on short syllables.

Individual dialects and subdialects
 Prekmurje dialect (prekmursko narečje, prekmurščina).
 Slovene Hills dialect (goričansko narečje, goričanščina)
 Prlekija dialect (prleško narečje, prleščina)
 Haloze dialect (haloško narečje, haloščina)

Notes

References

Slovene dialects